was a  after Chōshō and before Eiji. This period spanned the years from September 1135 through July 1141.

Change of Era
 February 15, 1035 : The new era name Hōen was created to mark an event or a series of events. The previous era ended and the new one commenced in Chōshō 4, on  the 27th day of the 4th month of 1135.

Events of the Hōen Era
 1136 (Hōen 2, 3rd month): The former-Emperor Toba hosted a grand dinner party.
 1136 (Hōen 2, 5th month): The sadaijin Fujiwara Ieyetada died at age 75.
 1136 (Hōen 2, 12th month): The udaijin Minamoto no Arihito was named sadaijin; and the naidaijin Fujiwara Munetada was named udaijin.
 1136 (Hōen 2, 12th month): Fujiwara Yorinaga was appointed Minister of the Center (naidaijin) at the age of 17.
 1138 (Hōen 4, 2nd month): The udaijin Munetada shaved his head at age 77; and he became a Buddhist priest.
 1138 (Hōen 4, 9th month): The former-Emperor Toba went to Mount Hiei, where he stayed for seven days.
 May 2, 1140 (Hōen 6, 14th day of the 4th month): The priests of the Buddhist temples on Mount Hiei banded together to burn down the Mii-dera again.

Notes

References
 Brown, Delmer M. and Ichirō Ishida, eds. (1979).  Gukanshō: The Future and the Past. Berkeley: University of California Press. ;  OCLC 251325323
 Nussbaum, Louis-Frédéric and Käthe Roth. (2005).  Japan encyclopedia. Cambridge: Harvard University Press. ;  OCLC 58053128
 Titsingh, Isaac. (1834). Nihon Odai Ichiran; ou,  Annales des empereurs du Japon.  Paris: Royal Asiatic Society, Oriental Translation Fund of Great Britain and Ireland. OCLC 5850691
 Varley, H. Paul. (1980). A Chronicle of Gods and Sovereigns: Jinnō Shōtōki of Kitabatake Chikafusa. New York: Columbia University Press. ;  OCLC 6042764

External links
 National Diet Library, "The Japanese Calendar" -- historical overview plus illustrative images from library's collection

Japanese eras